Milena Čelesnik (10 September 1933 – 4 May 2017) was a Slovenian athlete. She competed in the women's discus throw at the 1960 Summer Olympics, representing Yugoslavia.

References

External links
 

1933 births
2017 deaths
Athletes (track and field) at the 1960 Summer Olympics
Slovenian female discus throwers
Olympic athletes of Yugoslavia
Sportspeople from Ljubljana